The following lists events that happened during 1818 in New Zealand.

Incumbents

Regal and viceregal
Head of State – King George III. With Prince George, Prince of Wales as prince regent.
Governor of New South Wales – Lachlan Macquarie

Events 
January (early) – Te Morenga leads 400 against Ngāiterangi and Ngāti Porou. They destroy the Matarehu pā on Motiti Island but the Ngāiterangi chief, Te Waru, is absent. They proceed to East Cape and campaign for several months against Ngāti Porou.
 7 February – Hongi Hika leads a second Ngā Puhi campaign against Ngāti Porou. They ravage many villages in the Bay of Plenty before passing East Cape and attacking Ngāti Porou in Hicks Bay.
November – Te Morenga returns to the Bay of Islands.
12 November – Thomas Holloway King, the first European born in New Zealand, dies, and is buried at Rangihoua.
Undated
Thomas Kendall's school at Rangihoua closes.
Kendall sends a manuscript spelling book of Māori to the Church Missionary Society but Professor Lee raises some doubts over it. (see 1820)

Births
 28 July (in England): Thomas Mason, horticulturist and politician. 
undated
 (in England): James FitzGerald, politician.
 Frederick Merriman, politician.

Deaths

See also
History of New Zealand
List of years in New Zealand
Military history of New Zealand
Timeline of New Zealand history
Timeline of New Zealand's links with Antarctica
Timeline of the New Zealand environment

References